The Village Development Committee was dissolved on 10 March 2017, and merged into Naukunda Rural Municipality. Previously, the Panchayat was dissolved and turned into the VDC by the Constitution of Nepal 1990. The following historical information will be available for reference, and may not be accurate or updated.

This Village Development Committee was located in Rasuwa District in the Bagmati Zone of northern Nepal. The former wards (5 – 9) of the VDC have been merged into ward number 1  and the former wards (1 – 4) of the VDC has been merged into ward number 2  of Naukunda Rural Municipality.

References

Populated places in Rasuwa District